Marmadua is a rural locality in the Western Downs Region, Queensland, Australia.

History 
The locality name is the name of a pastoral station in the 1880s. In the 1870s it was an outstation of the Weranga Station.

References

Further reading
 

Western Downs Region
Localities in Queensland